António José da Costa Silva (born 23 November 1952) is a Portuguese professor, businessman and politician serving as the current Minister of the Economy and Maritime Affairs since 30 March 2022, part of the third Costa cabinet.

Costa Silva studied Mining Engineering at Technical University of Lisbon's Higher Technical Institute, going on to earn a master’s in Petroleum Engineering from Imperial College and a PhD in Petrol Reserve Engineering from both his previous colleges.

He started working in Angola at Sonangol in 1980 and from 1984 to 1997 he worked at Companhia Portuguesa de Serviços.

He was Director of Reservoir Engineering and Production at Beicip-Franlab, the corporate branch of the French Petroleum Institute, in Paris from 2001 to 2003, Executive Director of the Compagnie Géneral de Geophysique in Portugal from 1998 to 2001 and CEO of Partex from 2004 to 2021.

He is professor emeritus at the Higher Technical Institute, where he taught Planning and Integrated Management of Energy Resources.

In 2020 he was invited by Prime Minister António Costa to draw up Portugal's COVID-19 pandemic economic recovery programme for the use of the European Union funds.

References

External links
 Biography in the Portuguese Government site

1952 births
Government ministers of Portugal
Living people